The Years Between (1946) is a British film directed by Compton Bennett and starring Michael Redgrave, Valerie Hobson and Flora Robson in an adaptation of the 1945 play The Years Between by Daphne du Maurier. It was shot at the Riverside Studios.

Plot

Diana Wentworth is told her husband, Michael, a British MI6 officer, who had been working with the French Resistance is dead, killed by the nazis in France during the Second World War. She struggles to accept this but is helped by the family nanny (Flora Robson). The nanny encourages her to stand for parliament in her late husband's seat and is supported by Sir Ernest Foster.

She lives in rural middle England on a large country estate, where her husband had supported local interests. She decides she can fill several of his roles. Not everyone supports a female in this capacity. She is pursued by a neighbouring landowner, Richard Llewelyn, who, during a V-1 attack, kisses her and proposes.

At the end of the war, as PoW camps are liberated, Michael Wentworth is rediscovered. Sir Ernest phones Diana to inform her and she has to shelve her plans with Richard.

She is about to marry again, and has become an MP, and  all must now readjust to the new situation.

Back home, Michael is somewhat estranged from his son Rodney ("Robin"). He finds his wardrobe empty: passed to charity. Diana has to explain to Richard that she loves him but must stay with Michael. Michael is particularly shocked to find she is an MP and is effectively doing his job. He asks her to stop and let him have his role back. He wants to turn back time. He eventually finds out about Richard but is less concerned about this than gaining his seat back in the House of Commons. They decide to split and Nanny tries to arbitrate.

Ultimately she returns to Michael in both heart and mind. The film ends with them both in the House of Commons.

Cast
 Michael Redgrave as Col. Michael Wentworth  
 Valerie Hobson as Diana Wentworth  
 Flora Robson as Nanny  
 James McKechnie as Richard Llewellyn  
 Felix Aylmer as Sir Ernest Foster  
 Dulcie Gray as Judy  
 John Gilpin as Robin Wentworth  
 Edward Rigby as Postman  
 Esma Cannon as Effie  
 Lyn Evans as Ames  
 Wylie Watson as Venning  
 Yvonne Owen as Alice  
 Muriel Aked as Mrs. May  
 Joss Ambler as Atherton  
 Ernest Butcher as Old Man
 Katie Johnson as Old Man's wife

Release
According to trade papers, the film was a "notable box office attraction" at British cinemas.

Critical reception
The New York Times wrote, "an intimate and sometimes touching tale...Intelligently handled by Compton Bennett who directed the drama with an eye toward distilling character and perception from his cast...But it is rather unfortunate that the cast's intense and genuine portrayals are not matched by the over-all effect of this serious but heavy vehicle."

It was the 22nd most popular film at the British box office in 1946 after The Wicked Lady, The Bells of St. Mary's, Piccadilly Incident, The Captive Heart, Road to Utopia, Caravan, Anchors Aweigh, The Corn Is Green, Gilda, The House on 92nd Street, The Overlanders, Appointment with Crime, The Bandit of Sherwood Forest, Kitty, Spellbound, Scarlet Street, Men of Two Worlds, Courage of Lassie, Mildred Pierce, The Spiral Staircase and Brief Encounter.

References

External links

Review of film at Variety

1946 films
1946 drama films
Films based on works by Daphne du Maurier
British films based on plays
Films directed by Compton Bennett
British drama films
Films with screenplays by Sydney Box
Films produced by Sydney Box
Films with screenplays by Muriel Box
Films produced by Betty Box
Films scored by Benjamin Frankel
British black-and-white films
1940s English-language films
1940s British films